Oldřich Kruták (born 30 May 1947) is a Czech rower. He competed in the men's eight event at the 1972 Summer Olympics.

References

External links
 

1947 births
Living people
Czech male rowers
Olympic rowers of Czechoslovakia
Rowers at the 1972 Summer Olympics
People from Břeclav
Sportspeople from the South Moravian Region